The 2019 European Parliament election in Germany was held on 26 May 2019, electing the 96 members of the national Germany constituency to the European Parliament. Both the CDU/CSU and SPD suffered major losses, while the Greens became the second largest party in a national-level election for the first time in German history.

Background 
The 2019 European Parliament election was first national election to be held in Germany since the 2017 federal election, in which Chancellor Angela Merkel's ruling coalition between the Christian Democrats and Social Democrats suffered major losses, while the right-wing, Eurosceptic party Alternative for Germany (AfD) entered parliament in third place. In 2018, the Greens and the AfD made large gains in state elections in Bavaria and Hesse, with the Greens moving into second place in each, whilst the Christian Democrats and Social Democrats each suffered 10+ point swings. Federal polling saw the Greens take a consistent lead over the SPD since October.

Electoral threshold 
Since the 2014 European Parliament election, Germany does not have a formal threshold of the vote share required in order for a party to win an EP seat. This has allowed a number of smaller parties to gain representation, since they only have to reach about 0.5% of the vote share needed to get their first seat with the Webster/Sainte-Laguë method.

Although the European Council had recommended that countries with greater than 35 MEPs should introduce a threshold between 2–5%, the German government abandoned its plans for a 2% threshold in November 2018.

Opinion polls

Graphical summary

Federal level

By state

Baden-Württemberg

Bavaria

Berlin

Hesse

Rhineland-Palatinate

Saarland

Results

Results by state
Results for each party by state.

Maps

Elected MEPs

References 

Germany
European Parliament elections in Germany
2019 elections in Germany